German Yuferov (born 2 June 1963) is a Soviet modern pentathlete. He competed at the 1988 Summer Olympics.

References

External links
 

1963 births
Living people
Soviet male modern pentathletes
Olympic modern pentathletes of the Soviet Union
Modern pentathletes at the 1988 Summer Olympics
Place of birth missing (living people)